Morning Patrol is a 1987 Greek science fiction art film directed by Nikos Nikolaidis. It introduced a new iconography to Nikolaidis' work and contains several elements somewhat resembling the thriller genre and post-apocalyptic science fiction. The film has an elaborate yet simple script of strongly contrasting moods. The film's dialogue contains excerpts taken from published works authored by Daphne du Maurier, Philip K. Dick, Raymond Chandler, and Herman Raucher.

It received the Best Director Award and the Greek National Ministry of Culture Award at the Thessaloniki Festival of Greek Cinema in October 1987, where Dinos Katsouridis also won the Best Cinematographer Award and Marie-Louise Bartholomew also won the Best Art Director Award. The film went on further to be officially selected for screening at Fantasporto in February 1989 where it was nominated for the International Fantasy Film Award and it was also officially selected for screening at the Avoriaz Fantastic Film Festival in January 1987 where it was nominated for the Grand Prize.

Plot
A lonely and perplexed woman, played by future Nikolaidis mainstay Michele Valley, wanders through the ruins of a destroyed and deserted city in a post-apocalyptic era. She wonders whatever happened and where did all the residents disappear to. She does not remember much about herself, including even her own name, where is she supposed to be going, and whether she ever had any relatives.

Her searches throughout the city are not successful and no one can help her. Memories of the past come in the form of dreams and bestow upon her guidance and hope; all alone, in a mysterious and abandoned place, she finds the travel difficult. The windows and doors of the city's buildings are all open and the city is almost entirely silent, a silence violated only by the sounds coming out of a film theater in which the protagonist finds herself at one instance.

However, the reigning silence is only an appearance, for at times the city comes alive and becomes a dangerous place. Carelessness and gullibility can cost lives. The woman finally meets a lonely man in despair, employed as a guard, eventually finding with him the ultimate link between love and death (a theme which Nikolaidis explored in his later films).

Cast
Michele Valley as Woman
Takis Spiridakis as Guard
Liana Hatzi as Drunkard		
Nikos Hatzis as Tramp
V. Kabouri
Takis Loukatos as Master
H. Mavros	
Panos Thanassoulis as Second Guard
Rania Trivela

References

External links
Morning Patrol at Nikos Nikolaidis (Film Director/Writer/Producer)

Morning Patrol at the Greek Film Archive Film Museum: Home Page, Digital Archives, Filmography
Morning Patrol at 5 Books, 6 Films, and... Nikos Nikolaidis: Films

Morning Patrol at The New York Times Movies
Γιώργος Ευθυμίου, «Πρωϊνή Περίπολος: Καθρέφτης Ονείρου» at Ντουέντε Magazine, Τεύχος #8, 2011: θεάτρου 

1980s avant-garde and experimental films
1987 drama films
1987 independent films
1980s road movies
1987 films
Films based on works by Daphne du Maurier
1980s business films
Films about alcoholism
Films about amnesia
Films about cities
Films about death
Films about films
Films about food and drink
Films about homelessness
Films about missing people
Films about security and surveillance
Films about sexuality
Films based on multiple works
Films based on works by Philip K. Dick
Films directed by Nikos Nikolaidis
Films set in a movie theatre
Films set in abandoned houses
Films set in Greece
Films shot in Greece
Greek drama films
1980s Greek-language films
Women and death
Greek avant-garde and experimental films